Mohammed Fahad Al-Harthi, is a Saudi writer, journalist and media expert, with more than 20 years of experience in the field of traditional and new media.

Al-Harthi is the chairman of the first Saudi Media Forum and chairman of the Saudi Media Award, 2019 . Also, he is a member of the board of directors at the World Association of Newspapers and News Publishers (WAN-IFRA), and a member of the board of directors of the Saudi Journalists Association. Al-Harthi is the group editor-in-chief of big titles such as Arrajol, Sayidaty and AboutHer, owned by the Saudi Research and Marketing Group.

Al-Harthi holds a master's degree in international journalism from City, University of London and a bachelor's degree in architecture.

Work experience 
Al-Harthi began his career with the London-based Asharq al-Awsat newspaper before joining the English-language newspaper Arab News as a reporter, in addition to being a visiting journalist for the London-based Financial Times. He was then transferred to the Saudi-published newspaper Al Eqtisadiah, where he went from being a journalist to becoming a front-page official, climbing up the ranks until he became editor-in-chief of the publication.

In 1997, Al-Harthi has been the editor-in-chief of Arrajol magazine, a London-based publication by the Saudi Research and Marketing Group. In 2002, Al-Harthi was presented with the Gulf Excellence Award in recognition of the magazine's success and wide circulation.

In 2004, Al-Harthi was appointed as editor-in-chief of the London-based Sayidaty and Al-Jamila magazines, both publications for the same Group. A year following his appointment as editor-in-chief, he relocated the headquarters of both magazines to Dubai, in Dubai Media City.

Al-Harthi played a major role in transforming Sayidaty into a leading model in the world of Arab journalism and digital media, as the publication’s name today represents a wide range of specialized magazines, websites, and platforms in various fields such as: Sayidaty Décor; Sayidaty Mother & Child; Sayidaty Fashion; Sayidaty Magazine in English; Sayidaty.net; Al-Jamila.com; Arrajol’s website; Sayidy.net, Sayidaty Kitchen; Sayidaty TV; Sayidaty Award for Excellence; ALMALL, which is the first digital shopping platform launched by an Arab publication; and AboutHer.com, an English-language site dedicated to highlighting the achievements of Saudi Arabian and Arab women.

From 2013 to 2016, Al-Harthi was also the editor-in-chief of Arab NewsAl-Harthi: Arab News to take voice of Arabs to the world, which is printed in Saudi Arabia in English for the Saudi Research and Marketing Group. Through the newspaper, he launched the Arab News Dialogue Forum project, which hosts seminars designed to facilitate the discussion of current issues by officials and diplomats.

TV shows
In 2015, Al-Harthi launched his talk show “Bidoun Shak” (Without Doubt) on MBC, taking on the role of presenter and editor-in-chief of one of the region’s most noticeable weekly programs that boldly addresses various social issues (in the style of reality television). The program had a significant impact, becoming a positive debate platform, in addition to being highly viewed. To this day, episodes and segments of the program still garner a high number of views on YouTube.

Corporate Social Responsibility Initiatives 
Mohammed Fahad Al-Harthi launched numerous corporate social responsibility initiatives that dealt with social and humanitarian issues, amongst which were:

 La Lizawaj Al Kaserat (against child brides): A campaign against child and underage girls’ marriage in the Arab World. The initiative gained region-wide buzz, with top public figures, politicians, ministers and celebrities voluntarily promoting the campaign. Signatures of more than ten thousand people were collected for petitions that helped stop five marriages of minors, in partnership with charity organizations in Saudi Arabia, Egypt and Yemen.
 Baader bel Khair (initiate goodness): A campaign recognizing other community and humanitarian initiatives, while creating awareness of volunteerism in society.
Khali Soutek Masmou Mish Makmou (let your voice be heard not taken away from you): A campaign against domestic violence encouraging abused women to speak up, under the slogan: Let Your Voice Be Heard, Not Suppressed.

Achievements

 In November 2016, Al Harthi was elected to the Board of Directors of the Saudi Journalists Association. 
 In June 2019, World Association of Newspapers and News Publishers (WAN-IFRA) in the UK elected Al-Harthi as a member of the board.
 In July 2019, he was appointed as the Chairman of the first Saudi Media Forum, held in November 2019, under the slogan ‘Media Industry: Opportunities and Challenges. He is also  the Chairman of the Saudi Media Awards, which includes categories: Journalism, Visual Production, Audio Production, and Personality of the Year.

Awards
In 2002, Al-Harthi was awarded with the Gulf Excellence Award 2002 in recognition of his achievements and success in journalism and in the fields of online and print media.

In 2014, Al-Harthi won the Media Innovation Award in Beirut for his achievements in the field of printed, visual, and digital media, achievements which have created success stories and innovative concepts for the media industry in the Arab region.

He is also a founding member of the Young Arab Leaders Forum in Davos Middle East, a member of the Gulf / 2000 project at Columbia University in New York, and a former member of the National Union of Journalists (UK & Ireland), in addition to being a key participant in several Arab and international media conferences and meetings. He also regularly publishes political articles in Al-Sharq Al-Awsat and Al-Bayan Newspapers, and he has a weekly column in Sayidaty magazine and a monthly in Arrajol magazine.

External links
 Saudi Media Forum
 Saudi Journalists Union
Bidoun Shak TV Show (Without Doubt)
 Sayidaty Magazine
 Kitchen Sayidaty
 Sayidaty TV
 Arrajol Magazine
 Aljamila Magazine
 Almall   
About Her
Sayidy
halapress

References

Living people
Saudi Arabian journalists
Saudi Arabian television presenters
Year of birth missing (living people)